Agent Blue was an alternative rock band from Stoke-on-Trent, England.
Their songs were featured in various media. "Something Else" and "Snowhill" are on the soundtracks of the racing games, FlatOut and Burnout Paradise, respectively. "Something Else" has also been used on various BBC television shows such as Blue Peter and most frequently Top Gear. The band themselves starred in the opening scenes of the television series, Mayo, playing the same track. "Sex Drugs and Rocks Through Your Window" was featured in an episode of the television series, Bones.

However, the band lost a great deal of momentum after the delayed release of their debut LP A Stolen Honda Vision which was not released for almost two years after its recording.

In 2007, Agent Blue decided to split up and released this statement on their website and Myspace page:

Members 
 Nic Andrews - vocals
 Mark Taylor - guitar
 Josh Hill - guitar
 Calum Murphy - bass
 Matt Jones - drums

Discography

Albums 
 A Stolen Honda Vision (2006)

Singles

References

External links 
Agent Blue on Myspace

English rock music groups
Music in Stoke-on-Trent
Musical groups disestablished in 2007
Fierce Panda Records artists